Tallow GAA is a Gaelic Athletic Association club based in Tallow, in west County Waterford, Ireland. The club has won the Waterford Senior Hurling Championship four times, first in 1936 and more recently in 1980, 1984 and 1985.  Tallow presently have four players on the Waterford county panel, James Murray, Aidan Kearney, Mark O' Brien and Thomas Ryan.

Tallow GAA's ground is called Páirc Eamonn de Paor after the former Waterford hurler & coach, Ned Power who taught in the local school through the 1960s, 1970s & 1980s. Ned played for and coached countless Tallow teams in both hurling & football.  He was widely regarded as one of the finest and most forward-thinking coach in GAA history, with many accolades and titles associated with his name. Ned died after a lengthy illness on 15 November 2007 at the age of 77.

Underage
Tallow is currently amalgamated with Knockanore Shamrocks and play under the name of Cois Bhride for the County and Western division Minor and Juvenile Championship.  Both clubs run separate teams for each other underage competition.

Honours
 Waterford Senior Hurling Championships: 4
 1936, 1980, 1984, 1985
 Waterford Intermediate Hurling Championships: 2
 1974, 1987,
 Waterford Junior Hurling Championships 3
 1925, 1930, 1981
 Waterford Under-21 Hurling Championships: 7
 1972, 1976, 1977, 1983, 2002, 2003, 2008(b)
 Waterford Minor Hurling Championships: 8
 1938, 1967, 1971, 1975, 1980, 1986, 1997, 2007(b)
 Waterford Intermediate Football Championship: 1
1976
 Waterford Junior Football Championships: 2
1975, 2010

Western Hurling Titles
 West Waterford Intermediate Hurling Championships: 4
1971, 1974, 1982, 1987
 West Waterford Junior Hurling Championships: 5 
1925, 1930, 1980, 1981, 2010
 West Waterford Under-21 Hurling Championships: 16
1969, 1972, 1974, 1975, 1976, 1977, 1978, 1979, 1981, 1982, 1983, 1988, 1999, 2002, 2003, 2008(b)
 West Waterford Minor Hurling Championships: 15
1938, 1956, 1967, 1968, 1971, 1972, 1974, 1975, 1979, 1980, 1981, 1986, 1997, 1999, 2007(b)

Western Football titles
 West Waterford Intermediate Football Championships: 1
1976
 West Waterford Junior Football Championships: 2
1975, 1994
 West Waterford Under-21 Football Championships: 5
1968, 1976, 1978, 1980, 1996 (with Shamrocks)
 West Waterford Minor Football Championships: 6
1967, 1968, 1969, 1971, 1972, 1973

External links
Tallow GAA website

Gaelic games clubs in County Waterford
Hurling clubs in County Waterford
Gaelic football clubs in County Waterford